Giampiero Pocetta (born May 25, 1965 in Rome) is a retired Italian soccer player, active as a midfielder during the eighties and the nineties.

He collected 102 played matches and three goals scored in Italian Serie D with teams Ternana, Monterotondo and Crotone, 86 matches played and one goal scored in Italian Serie C2 with teams Ternana, Palermo, Viareggio, Frosinone and Fano, 159 played matches and four goals scored in Italian Serie C1 with teams Ternana and Palermo, 18 played matches and no goals in Italian Serie B with team Palermo.

External links
 Official Site
 Official Site

1965 births
Living people
Footballers from Rome
Italian footballers
Association football midfielders
Pol. Monterotondo Lupa players